Camp Pendleton Mainside is a census-designated place (CDP) in San Diego County, California, located at the southeast corner of the Marine Corps Base Camp Pendleton. Per the 2020 census, the population was 9,683. It was formerly known as Camp Pendleton North, but its name was changed for the 2020 Census. Along with Camp Pendleton South, it is one of two CDPs located on the base.

Geography
Camp Pendleton Mainside is located at  (33.304869, −117.306125).

Demographics

2020 census

Note: the US Census treats Hispanic/Latino as an ethnic category. This table excludes Latinos from the racial categories and assigns them to a separate category. Hispanics/Latinos can be of any race.

2010 Census
At the 2010 census Camp Pendleton North had a population of 5,200. The racial makeup of Camp Pendleton North was 3,730 (71.7%) White, 501 (9.6%) African American, 83 (1.6%) Native American, 151 (2.9%) Asian, 80 (1.5%) Pacific Islander, 305 (5.9%) from other races, and 350 (6.7%) from two or more races. Hispanic or Latino of any race were 1,157 persons (22.3%).

The census reported that 3,561 people (68.5% of the population) lived in households, 1,627 (31.3%) lived in non-institutionalized group quarters, and 12 (0.2%) were institutionalized.

There were 1,069 households, 817 (76.4%) had children under the age of 18 living in them, 921 (86.2%) were opposite-sex married couples living together, 104 (9.7%) had a female householder with no husband present, 13 (1.2%) had a male householder with no wife present.  There were 7 (0.7%) unmarried opposite-sex partnerships, and 5 (0.5%) same-sex married couples or partnerships. 29 households (2.7%) were one person and 1 (0.1%) had someone living alone who was 65 or older. The average household size was 3.33.  There were 1,038 families (97.1% of households); the average family size was 3.39.

The age distribution was 1,502 people (28.9%) under the age of 18, 2,376 people (45.7%) aged 18 to 24, 1,235 people (23.8%) aged 25 to 44, 76 people (1.5%) aged 45 to 64, and 11 people (0.2%) who were 65 or older.  The median age was 21.3 years. For every 100 females, there were 177.6 males.  For every 100 females age 18 and over, there were 218.2 males.

There were 1,259 housing units at an average density of 139.0 per square mile, of the occupied units 16 (1.5%) were owner-occupied and 1,053 (98.5%) were rented. The homeowner vacancy rate was 0%; the rental vacancy rate was 15.2%.  49 people (0.9% of the population) lived in owner-occupied housing units and 3,512 people (67.5%) lived in rental housing units.

2000 Census
At the 2000 census there were 8,197 people, 1,408 households, and 1,375 families in the CDP. The population density was 911.7 inhabitants per square mile (352.0/km). The racial makeup of the CDP was 67.10% White, 10.60% African American, 1.61% Native American, 2.82% Asian, 0.34% Pacific Islander, 12.89% from other races, and 4.64% from two or more races. Hispanic or Latino of any race were 22.62%.

Of the 1,408 households 71.9% had children under the age of 18 living with them, 90.3% were married couples living together, 5.4% had a female householder with no husband present, and 2.3% were non-families. 1.7% of households were one person and none had someone living alone who was 65 or older.  The average household size was 3.15 and the average family size was 3.15.

The age distribution was 20.1% under the age of 18, 60.2% from 18 to 24, 18.5% from 25 to 44, and 1.2% from 45 to 64.  The median age was 21 years. For every 100 females, there were 226.8 males.  For every 100 females age 18 and over, there were 294.9 males.

The median household income was $28,558 and the median family income  was $28,942. Males had a median income of $14,486 versus $16,907 for females. The per capita income for the CDP was $13,085.  About 8.6% of families and 9.7% of the population were below the poverty line, including 12.4% of those under age 18 and none of those age 65 or over.

Government

See also
 Camp Pendleton South CDP

References

Census-designated places in San Diego County, California
North County (San Diego County)
Census-designated places in California